Rhabdodryas is a genus of butterflies in the family Pieridae. The only species is the straight-line sulphur (Rhabdodryas trite).

R. trite puddles with other yellows and sulphurs including the statira sulphur (Aphrissa statira) and apricot sulphur (Phoebis argante); and orange-banded sulphur (Phoebis philea).

References

Coliadinae
Pieridae genera
Taxa named by Frederick DuCane Godman
Taxa named by Osbert Salvin